Incarceration may refer to:
Incarceration, the detention of a person in jail or prison
Incarcerated hernia
Uterine incarceration